Jedidiah "Jed" Zayner (born December 13, 1984, in Valparaiso, Indiana) is a retired American soccer player.

Career

Youth and college
Zayner grew up in Orland Park, Illinois, attended Carl Sandburg High School where his team won back-to-back state championships, and he followed that with back-to-back NCAA national championships at Indiana University where he played college soccer from 2003 to 2005. In his three seasons there he started 65 games earning one goal and 4 assists. He also played for three seasons with Chicago Fire Premier in the USL Premier Development League.

Professional
Zayner was drafted in the second round, 13th overall, of the 2006 MLS SuperDraft by the Columbus Crew, but saw no first-team games during the 2006 season due to injury. He made his MLS debut for Crew on 20 June 2007, against Kansas City Wizards. During the 2008 season Zayner also spent a short time on loan with the Cleveland City Stars of the USL Second Division, making two appearances. On August 5, 2010, he was traded to D.C. United along with a fourth-round pick in the 2011 MLS SuperDraft in exchange for a second-round pick in the 2012 MLS SuperDraft.

He remained with D.C. United through the 2011 season. At season's end, the club declined his 2012 contract option and he entered the 2011 MLS Re-Entry Draft. Zayner was not selected in the draft and became a free agent.

Zayner signed with San Jose Earthquakes on 20 June 2012. On July 29, 2012, Zayner made his first appearance for the Earthquakes in a 1–1 draw with Chicago Fire.

At the end of the 2012 MLS season, Zayner announced he was retiring from playing professional soccer.

International
Zayner has represented the U.S. at the Under-18 level, and was a member of the U-20 pool in 2003.

Personal
Zayner serves as a celebrity spokesman for both the U.S. Soccer Foundation's Passback program and Lacelet, a fund-raising accessory that benefits the Juvenile Diabetes Research Foundation. He also began his own non-profit company called Filleo  in 2007.  The company sells T-shirts and raises money to provide clothing and education to youth in need.

Jed married his wife Katherine in 2008.  They have three sons.

Zayner is a Christian. Zayner has spoken about his faith saying, "God gives us a purpose, and He gives us a hope—a hope that [even though] this life is so short, heaven is forever."

Honors

Columbus Crew
Major League Soccer MLS Cup (1): 2008
Major League Soccer Supporters' Shield (3): 2008, 2009, 2012

Indiana University
NCAA Men's Division I Soccer Championship (2): 2003, 2004

References

External links
 

1984 births
Living people
American soccer players
Indiana Hoosiers men's soccer players
Chicago Fire U-23 players
Columbus Crew players
Cleveland City Stars players
D.C. United players
San Jose Earthquakes players
Soccer players from Indiana
USL League Two players
USL Second Division players
Major League Soccer players
Columbus Crew draft picks
United States men's youth international soccer players
United States men's under-20 international soccer players
Association football defenders